Andrey Mikhaylovich Mishin (born May 28, 1979) is a boxer from Russia, who competed for his native country at the 2000 Summer Olympics in Sydney, Australia. Mishin further won silver and gold medals at European Amateur Boxing Championships in the Men's Light-Middleweight (– 71 kg) division.

References
 

1979 births
Living people
Light-middleweight boxers
Boxers at the 2000 Summer Olympics
Olympic boxers of Russia
Sportspeople from Irkutsk
Russian male boxers